William Bristol (June 2, 1779 – March 7, 1836) was a Mayor of New Haven, Connecticut and a United States district judge of the United States District Court for the District of Connecticut.

Education and career

Born on June 2, 1779, in Hamden, Connecticut, Bristol graduated from Yale University in 1798 and read law in 1800, with David Daggett. He entered private practice in New Haven, Connecticut starting in 1800. He was United States Attorney for the District of Connecticut starting in 1812. He was a member of the Connecticut House of Representatives in 1817. He was a member of the Connecticut Senate from 1818 to 1819. He was an alderman for New Haven in 1818, 1821, and 1826. He was a Judge of the Connecticut Superior Court and justice of the Connecticut Supreme Court of Errors (now the Connecticut Supreme Court) from 1819 to 1826. He was the Mayor of New Haven in 1827.

Federal judicial service

Bristol was nominated by President John Quincy Adams on May 15, 1826, to a seat on the United States District Court for the District of Connecticut vacated by Judge Pierpont Edwards. He was confirmed by the United States Senate on May 22, 1826, and received his commission the same day. His service terminated on March 7, 1836, due to his death in New Haven. He was interred in Grove Street Cemetery in New Haven.

Family

Bristol married Sarah Edwards of New Haven in New Haven, on January 6, 1805. Sarah died on December 24, 1866, aged 86 years.

References

Sources
 

1779 births
1836 deaths
Mayors of New Haven, Connecticut
Connecticut city council members
Connecticut state senators
Members of the Connecticut House of Representatives
United States Attorneys for the District of Connecticut
Judges of the United States District Court for the District of Connecticut
United States federal judges appointed by John Quincy Adams
19th-century American judges
Burials at Grove Street Cemetery
Members of the Connecticut General Assembly Council of Assistants (1662–1818)
United States federal judges admitted to the practice of law by reading law
Justices of the Connecticut Supreme Court